Sergei Zhuravlyov may refer to:

 Sergei Zhuravlyov (footballer, born 1976), Russian football player
 Serhiy Zhuravlyov (born 1959), Ukrainian football player